The governance of the Gaza Strip since the Hamas takeover of the Gaza Strip in June 2007 has been carried out by Hamas, which is often referred to as the Hamas government in Gaza. The Hamas administration was led by Ismail Haniyeh from 2007 to 2014 and again from 2016.

After Hamas won the Palestinian legislative elections on 25 January 2006, Ismail Haniyeh was nominated Prime Minister, establishing a Palestinian national unity government with Fatah. This government effectively collapsed with the outbreak of the violent conflict between Hamas and Fatah. After the takeover of the Gaza Strip by Hamas on 14 June 2007, Palestinian Authority Chairman Abbas dismissed the Hamas-led government and appointed Salam Fayyad Prime Minister. Though the new Ramallah-based Palestinian government's authority was claimed to extend to all Palestinian territories, in effect it became limited to the West Bank, as Hamas would not recognize the dismissal and continued to rule the Gaza Strip. Both administrations – the Fatah government in Ramallah and the Hamas government in Gaza – regarded themselves as the sole legitimate government of the Palestinian National Authority. The international community and Palestine Liberation Organization, however, recognized the Ramallah administration as the legitimate government.

Since the division between the two parties, there have been conflicts between Hamas and similar factions operating in Gaza, and with Israel, most notably the Gaza War of 2008-2009 and the 2014 Gaza War. The radicalization of the Gaza Strip brought internal conflicts between various groups, in events like 2009 Hamas crackdown on Jund Ansar Allah, an al-Qaeda affiliated group, resulting in 22 people killed; and the April 2011 Hamas crackdown on Jahafil Al-Tawhid Wal-Jihad fi Filastin, a Salafist group involved in Vittorio Arrigoni's murder. Since 2015, ISIL-affiliated groups in Gaza have also become Hamas' matter of concern.

Negotiations toward reconciliation between Fatah and Hamas, which were mediated by Egypt, produced a preliminary agreement in 2011, which was supposed to be implemented by May 2012 through joint elections. Despite the peace plan, Palestinian sources were quoted in January 2012 as saying that the May joint elections "would not be possible". In February 2012, Khaled Meshal and Palestinian Authority President Mahmoud Abbas signed the Hamas–Fatah Doha agreement towards implementation of the 2011 Cairo accords, though Hamas officials in the Gaza Strip expressed their discontent and "unacceptibility" of the Doha agreement. A unity government was sworn on 2 June 2014. The government was supposed to exercise its functions in Gaza, or to form a government of national unity whose members would be from all Palestinian factions, including Hamas, Fatah and all other factions, and which would be responsible for Gaza and the West Bank and prepare for elections but it did not happen because of disagreements between the two parties. Nevertheless, the unity government had failed to implement authority over Gaza Strip and from September 2016 Hamas gradually expanded the authority of its Deputy Minister and Director General-level positions based in Gaza, in a move widely referred as establishment of an alternative government.

History

Prelude to division

Conflict between Fatah and Hamas began simmering when Hamas won the Palestinian legislative elections in January 2006. Israel and the Quartet—comprising the United States, the European Union, Russia and the United Nations—demanded that the new Hamas government accept all previous agreements, recognize Israel's right to exist, and renounce violence; when Hamas refused, they cut off aid to the Palestinian Authority.

Major conflict erupted in Gaza in December 2006, when the Hamas executive authority attempted to replace the Palestinian police as the primary authority in Gaza.

On 8 February 2007 Saudi-sponsored negotiations in Mecca produced an agreement on a Palestinian national unity government. The agreement was signed by Mahmoud Abbas on behalf of Fatah and Khaled Mashal on behalf of Hamas. The new government was called on to achieve Palestinian national goals as approved by the Palestine National Council, the clauses of the Basic Law and the National Reconciliation Document (the "Prisoners' Document") as well as the decisions of the Arab summit.

In March 2007, the Palestinian Legislative Council approved formation a national unity government with 83-3 vote. Government ministers were sworn in by Abbas, the president on the Palestinian National Authority, at ceremonies held in Gaza and Ramallah. In June that year, Hamas took control of the Gaza Strip from the national unity government after forcing out Fatah.

On 14 June 2007, Abbas announced the dissolution of the former unity government and declared a state of emergency. He dismissed Ismail Haniya as prime minister and appointed Salam Fayyad in his place, giving him the task of building a new government.
Nonetheless, Hamas rejected the decree of Abbas and said the Ismail Haniya government would remain in office and continue to function as the government of the Palestinian National Authority.

June 2007 Hamas government

Takeover by Hamas
With Hamas in control of the Gaza Strip and Fatah in control of the West Bank, there were two de facto governments in the Palestinian territories, each claiming to be the legitimate government of the Palestinian Authority. On 14 June 2007, Abbas dismissed the Hamas-dominated PA government of March 2007, but Haniyye refused to accept the dismissal and declared the formation of a new Hamas government in June 2007, as West Bank resident Ministers in the Palestinian government were deposed by Fatah.

Palestinian police chief Kamal el-Sheikh ordered his men in the Gaza Strip not to work or obey Hamas orders. However, many Fatah members fled the Gaza Strip to the West Bank, and Fatah gunmen stormed Hamas-led institutions in the West Bank after the Battle of Gaza.

Palestinian legislator Saeb Erekat said the PA officially has no control in the Gaza Strip. Hamas and Fatah accused each other of a coup d'état, with neither recognizing the authority of the other government.

The United States, EU, and Israel have not recognized the Hamas government, but support Palestinian President Mahmoud Abbas and Prime Minister Salam Fayyad's government in the West Bank. The Arab League called on all parties to stop the fighting and return the government to its status before the Battle of Gaza, which would be the 2007 unity government and not the new PA government appointed by Abbas. Although the United States does not officially recognize the Hamas government, it holds it "fully and entirely responsible for the Gaza Strip," United States Assistant Secretary of State Sean McCormack said.

On 16 June 2007, Haniya declared Said Fanuna (officially a Fatah general who, in reality, distanced himself from Abbas) as the new security chief in the Gaza Strip, stating him as a "higher police command" than the West Bank-based police chief Kamal el-Sheikh of the Fatah.

Internal and external conflicts
After the division of the two Palestinian parties, the West Bank remained relatively quiet, but the Gaza Strip was the scene of constant conflict between Hamas and various other factions opposing Israel, with the most notable conflict being the Gaza War of 2008-2009.

In 2009, a radical Salafist cleric declared an "Islamic Emirate" in Gaza, accusing Hamas of failing to implement full Sharia law. The radicalization of the Gaza Strip and attempt to undermine Hamas authority resulted in the 2009 Hamas crackdown on Jund Ansar Allah, an Al-Qaeda affiliated group, that lasted two days and resulted in 22 deaths.

Reports in March 2010 suggested that Ahmed Jabari described the security situation in Gaza as deteriorating, and that Hamas was starting to lose control. Nevertheless, the Hamas continued to exercise authority.

In April 2011, Hamas conducted another crackdown, this one on a Salafist group reportedly involved in Vittorio Arrigoni's murder.

During the Arab Spring
Hamas praised the Arab Spring, but its offices in Damascus were directly affected by the Syrian Civil War. The Hamas leader Khaled Mashal eventually relocated to Jordan, and Hamas began to distance itself from the Syrian government in the backdrop of the Syrian civil war. The evacuation of Hamas offices from Damascus may be the principal reason for the Doha ratification agreement signed by Abbas and Mashal, but it was also suggested that this was done due to a rift between Hamas Government in Gaza and the external Hamas office, led by Mashal. Essentially, the Doha deal does not reflect any real reconciliation among the factions of the Hamas Government.

Following the events of the 2011 Egyptian Revolution, and the consequent election of an Islamist president in Egypt, Hamas relations with Egypt improved, and in 2012 Egypt eased the permit requirements for Palestinians from Gaza entering through the Rafah crossing. In July 2012, reports circulated that the Hamas Government was considering declaring the independence of the Gaza Strip with the help of Egypt.

September 2012 Hamas government

In September 2012, Ismail Haniya, head of the Hamas government in Gaza, announced a cabinet reshuffle, appointing seven new ministers including a new finance minister. Haniya said the reshuffle was "normal procedure after nearly six years of work by some ministers and in order to achieve specific goals for the current period."

Haniya said he had postponed carrying out the cabinet reshuffle several times to allow time for a reconciliation process between Fatah and Hamas to succeed. The two sides have been trying to implement the terms of an April 2011 reconciliation deal for months now, but appear no closer to achieving either the consensus interim government or the legislative and presidential elections called for by the agreement. This followed a May 2012, a new Fatah government appointment in the West Bank, in a move that has angered the Hamas government in Gaza, which slammed the decision to form a new cabinet, accusing Abbas's Palestinian Authority and the Fatah movement he heads of abandoning reconciliation.

2016 Hamas administration

The Hamas government of 2016 is the third de facto Hamas government in the Gaza Strip since the Hamas takeover of the Gaza Strip in 2007. On 17 October 2016 it as announced that the Supreme Administrative Committee, which is in charge of the conduct of Gaza's ministries, had carried out a Cabinet reshuffle in active ministries and a change the positions of 16 deputy ministers and directors general in government institutions. The new administration was composed of Deputy Ministers, Directors General and other high-level officials, not directly bound to the Ramallah administration. It was initially speculated that the 2016 Hamas government was an attempt to return Ismail Haniyeh to full control of the Gaza Strip. As part of the government cganges, the Ministry of Planning was abolished.

According to some views, the third Hamas cabinet de facto succeeded the failed 2014 national unity government, which was reshuffled by Palestinian President Mahmud Abbas in July 2015 without Hamas consent and was announced by Hamas as expired on 19 October 2016. "Coalition for Accountability and Integrity - Aman" said that the formation of this committee was a declaration of a new government in the Gaza Strip. Youssef Mahmoud, the spokesman for the consensus Palestinian government, said that every action made in Gaza without the consensus government's approval is illegitimate and not recognized by the Ramallah government. Ismail Haniyeh, the Prime Minister of the 2007 and 2012 Hamas-led governments, considers the 2015 Fatah-dominated government in Ramallah as illegitimate. The Hamas government of 2016 exercises de facto rule over the Gaza Strip, supported by the Palestinian Legislative Council, which is dominated by members of Hamas.

In March 2017, the Fatah dominated government in the West Bank expressed its concern that the Gaza administration is being upgraded by Hamas into a full-fledged 'shadow government'. Further in April and May 2017, Abbas vowed to take unprecedented measures to end the division - cutting 30-50% of Gaza Strip-based employees of the Palestinian administration, suspending social assistance to 630 families and preventing Gazan cancer patients from reaching treatment in Jerusalem or Israeli hospitals. In addition, Ramallah-based government stopped paying for Gazan electricity bills to Israel and on April 28 Abbas approved early retirement of 35,000 military personnel in Gaza (originally funded by the Ramallah administration) and cut financial aid to former Hamas prisoners.

On 14 June 2021, Hamas announced that Issam al-Da’alis was the new prime minister of the Hamas government in Gaza, succeeding Mohammed Awad who resigned after two years in the position. The PA previously expressed opposition to the formation of a Hamas government in the Gaza Strip. In 2017, Hamas announced its decision to dismantle the administrative committee it had set up as a de facto government in the Gaza Strip, which was taken to promote reconciliation with the PA.

Government and politics
In 2006, Hamas won the 2006 Palestinian legislative elections and assumed administrative control of Gaza Strip and West Bank. In 2007, Hamas led a military victory over Fatah, the secular Palestinian nationalist party, which had dominated the Palestinian National Authority. As a result, Palestinian President Mahmoud Abbas declared state of emergency and released Hamas Prime Minister Haniye - a move not recognized by the Hamas party, which de facto continued administration and military control of the Gaza Strip, while in the PNA controlled West Bank another government was established with Fatah domination.

Both regimes - the Ramallah and Gaza government regard themselves as the sole legitimate government of the Palestinian National Authority. Egyptian-mediated negotiations toward reconciliation between the Fatah and the Hamas government produced a preliminary agreement, planned to be implemented by May 2012 in joint elections. To date, the Hamas government is only economically bonded with the Ramallah-based Palestinian National Authority, performing the governing over the Gaza Strip independently.

Governing structure

Governorates of the Gaza Strip are 5 administrative districts. After the signing of the Oslo Accords in 1993, the Palestinian territories of the West Bank and Gaza Strip were divided into three areas (Area A, Area B, and Area C) and 16 governorates under the jurisdiction of the Palestinian National Authority. In 2005, Israel withdrew from the Gaza Strip, enlarging the administered Palestinian territories in that region. In 2007, following the War of Brothers in the Gaza Strip between Fatah and Hamas, the later took over the area and expelled all Palestinian Authority officials, affiliated with Fatah. It has since administered the five districts, including eight cities.

Deir al-Balah Governorate
Khan Yunis Governorate
Rafah Governorate
North Gaza Governorate
Gaza Governorate

Security 
After having confronted and disarmed significant Fatah-supporting hamullas, or clans, Hamas had a near monopoly on arms inside Gaza. In March 2010, however, Ahmed Jabari described the security situation in Gaza as deteriorating and said Hamas was starting to lose control. In June 2011, the Independent Commission for Human Rights published a report whose findings included that the Palestinians in the West Bank and the Gaza Strip were subjected in 2010 to an "almost systematic campaign" of human rights abuses by the Ramallah and Hamas administrations, as well as by Israeli authorities, with the security forces belonging to the Ramallah and Hamas government being responsible for torture, arrests and arbitrary detentions.

A 2012 report by Nathan J. Brown found increasing authoritarian actions in the administration of the Gaza Strip, with opposition parties restricted from performing public activities. Brown found that the Hamas government increasingly took on tendencies seen in past administrations by the rival Fatah party, which ruled over the West Bank. Parties affiliated with Fatah, as well as affiliated NGOs, have been subjected to stricter controls. One such NGO, the Sharek Youth Forum, was closed in 2010. The United Nations Resident and Humanitarian Coordinator in the occupied Palestinian Territory requested that Hamas reconsider dissolving that NGO.

In June 2013, as a result of pressure from Egypt, Hamas deployed a 600-strong force to prevent rocket fire into Israel from Gaza. The following months showed a dramatic decline in the number of rockets fired at Israel. in February 2014, however, Hamas removed most of the anti-rocket force it had deployed to prevent cross-border attacks on Israel. This move by Hamas is likely to have been interpreted as a green light to fire on Israel by the various other terror groups in Gaza, such as the Islamic Jihad Movement in Palestine, which carried out in excess of 60 rocket attacks on southern Israel, on March 12, 2014 alone. In the wake of this incident of rocket-fire into Israel, and the many other incidents that followed, Israel warned that it might invade Gaza if the attacks did not cease.

As further rocket attacks continued, Israel took action in the summer of 2014 by carrying out a temporary invasion of the Gaza Strip, during which more than 800 Hamas members were killed by the IDF (according to Israel's ITIC organization) - note that casualty statistics in Gaza-Israeli conflicts are commonly up for debate and controversy (the latter analyses the casualty figures from the 2008-09 Gaza conflict). This came as a major blow to Hamas, and to their support in the Gaza Strip. The emergence of a recent faction of the Islamic State of Iraq and the Levant (yet to be officially confirmed) within the Strip has also added security-concerns amongst Hamas officials, following the unsuccessful defence of the Strip against Israel's Operation Protective Edge. On May 31, 2015, the Islamic State Group offshoot, also calling itself the "Sheikh Omar Hadid Brigade", claimed responsibility for the assassination of a high ranking Hamas commander, whose vehicle was blown up when an on-board bomb was detonated.

Finance and economics 
Upon taking power, Hamas announced they would refuse to honour past international agreements between the Palestinian government and Israel. As a result, the United States and the EU cut off aid to the Gaza Strip, and Israel and the Middle East Quartet implemented punitive economic measures against the Gaza Strip. They view the group as a terrorist organization, and have pressured Hamas to recognize Israel, renounce violence, and make good on past agreements. Prior to disengagement, 120,000 Palestinians from Gaza were employed in Israel or in joint projects.  After the Israeli withdrawal, the gross domestic product of the Gaza Strip declined.  Israeli enterprises shut down, work relationships were severed and job opportunities in Israel dried up.

Following Hamas takeover in 2007, key international powers, including the EU, US and Israel showed public support for the new Fatah administration without Hamas. The EU and US normalized the tie to the Palestinian National Authority and resumed direct aid. Israel announced it would return frozen tax revenue of about US$800m to the new Fatah administration. Israel also imposed a naval blockade of the Hamas-controlled Gaza Strip, which ensured Mediterranean imports of goods into the Strip did not include any sort of weaponry. The naval policy was stopped, and then was re-initiated in early 2014, when an arms shipment was seized by the IDF. The move disabled Hamas from making further investments in weapon-trade with Iran, and other Iranian backed groups such as Hezbollah in Lebanon.

Despite the active blockade (which many claimed also restricted non-weapon related trade, such as food supply), Hamas leader Mahmoud Zahar said, speaking in 2012, that Gaza's economic situation has improved and Gaza has become self-reliant "in several aspects except petroleum and electricity."  Zahar said that Gaza's economic conditions are better than those in the West Bank. However, such statements have been considered political propaganda by many, and could have been aimed towards diminishing the economic successes of the rival Fatah political party in the West Bank, at a time when tensions between the two parties became particularly intense.

2012 fuel crisis
Gaza generally obtained its diesel fuel from Israel, but in 2011, Hamas began buying cheaper fuel from Egypt, bringing it via a network of tunnels, and refused to buy it from Israel.

In early 2012, due to internal economic disagreement between the Palestinian Authority and the Hamas Government in Gaza, decreased supplies from Egypt through tunnel smuggling, and Hamas's refusal to ship fuel via Israel, the Gaza Strip plunged into a fuel crisis, bringing increasingly long electricity shut downs and disruption of transportation.  Egypt  attempted to stop the use of tunnels for delivery of Egyptian fuel purchased by Palestinian authorities, and severely reduced supply through the tunnel network. As the crisis deepened, Hamas sought to equip the Rafah terminal between Egypt and Gaza for fuel transfer, and refused to accept fuel delivered via the Kerem Shalom crossing between Israel and Gaza.

In mid-February, as the crisis escalated, Hamas rejected an Egyptian proposal to bring in fuel via the Kerem Shalom Crossing between Israel and Gaza to reactivate Gaza's only power plant.  Ahmed Abu Al-Amreen of the Hamas-run Energy Authority refused it on the grounds that the crossing is operated by Israel and Hamas' fierce opposition to the existence of Israel. Egypt cannot ship diesel fuel to Gaza directly through the Rafah crossing point, because it is limited to the movement of individuals.

In early March, the head of Gaza's energy authority stated that Egypt wanted to transfer energy via the Kerem Shalom Crossing, but he personally refused it to go through the "Zionist entity" (Israel) and insisted that Egypt transfer the fuel through the Rafah Crossing, although this crossing is not equipped to handle the half-million liters needed each day.

In late March, Hamas began offering carpools of Hamas state vehicles for people to get to work.  Many Gazans began to wonder how these vehicles have fuel themselves, as diesel was completely unavailable in Gaza, ambulances could no longer be used, but Hamas government officials still had fuel for their own cars. Many Gazans said that Hamas confiscated the fuel it needed from petrol stations and used it exclusively for their own purposes.

Responded with another citizen of Rafah: 'Nude talk more about health crisis in Rafah and more exploited in the Drivers' Rafah ', while the other response more sharply, he said:' I wish, Lord, tells the story of Sheikh Eid any of these buses come from? , Is the bus power was to change the color and print the names and fake companies, good company, company Ailia, Islamic Society, as well as be confiscated diesel fuel from the stations and tunnels and traders, and is then to organize a campaign on behalf of Hamas to relieve citizens, but everyone knows ...... ., the story of diesel buses and the story of a failed attempt to improve the image of Hamas'

Egypt agreed to provide 600,000 liters of fuel to Gaza daily, but it had no way of delivering it that Hamas would agree to.

In addition, Israel introduced a number of goods and vehicles into the Gaza Strip via the Kerem Shalom Crossing, as well as the normal diesel for hospitals. Israel also shipped 150,000 liters of diesel through the crossing, which was paid for by the Red Cross.

In April 2012, the issue was resolved as certain amounts of fuel were supplied with the involvement of the Red Cross, after the Palestinian Authority and Hamas reached a deal.  Fuel was finally transferred via the Israeli Kerem Shalom Crossing.

International aid

Israeli cooperation
In January and February 2011, the United Nations Office for the Coordination of Humanitarian Affairs (UNOCHA) conducted an assessment of the effects of the measures to ease the access restrictions. They concluded that they did not result in a significant improvement in people's livelihoods. They found that the "pivotal nature of the remaining restrictions" and the effects of three years of strict blockade prevented a significant improvement in livelihoods and called on Israel to fully abolish the blockade including removing restrictions on the import of construction materials and the exports of goods, and to lift the general ban on the movement of people between Gaza and the West Bank via Israel in order to comply with what they described as international humanitarian and human rights law obligations.

International visits
Qatari Emir Hamad bin Khalifa Al Thani became the first foreign leader to visit the enclave since Hamas' takeover.
 On 16 November 2012, following the death of Ahmed Jabril, Egyptian Prime Minister Hisham Qandil visited the enclave, leading to a brief ceasefire offer by Israel. Tunisia's Foreign Minister Rafik Abdessalem and Turkey's Foreign Minister Ahmet Davutoglu visited Gaza in November 2012 as well.

Current budget
Most of the Gaza Strip administration funding comes from outside as an aid, with large portion delivered by UN organizations directly to education and food supply. Most of the Gaza GDP of $700 million comes as foreign humanitarian and direct economic support. Of those funds, the major part is supported by the U.S. and the European Union. Portions of the direct economic support have been provided by the Arab League, though it largely has not provided funds according to schedule. Among other alleged sources of Gaza administration budget is Iran.

A diplomatic source told Reuters that Iran had funded Hamas in the past with up to $300 million per year, but the flow of money had not been regular in 2011. "Payment has been in suspension since August", said the source. The government of President Bashar al-Assad in Syria had been a stalwart ally and a conduit for Iranian money. But due to sectarian considerations following the revolt in Syria, Hamas decided to shut its political bureau in Damascus. Hamas' break with Syria has meant a sharp cut in the financing it received from Iran. In response, Hamas has raised taxes and fees considerably. Setting up its own lavish civil administration in Gaza that issues papers, licenses, insurance and numerous other permissions — and always for a tax or a fee.

In January 2012, some diplomatic sources have said that Turkey promised to provide Haniyeh's Gaza Strip administration with $300 million to support its annual budget.

In April 2012, the Hamas government in Gaza approved its budget for 2012, which was up 25% year-on-year over 2011 budget, indicating that donors, including Iran, benefactors in the Islamic world and Palestinian expatriates, are still heavily funding the movement. Chief of Gaza's parliament's budget committee Jamal Nassar said the 2012 budget is $769 million, compared to $630 million in 2011.

According to OpEd columnist Thomas Friedman of The New York Times, Gaza has been woefully mismanaged by Hamas: Gaza is pumping all its drinking water from its coastal aquifer at triple its renewable rate of rechargeand, as a result, saltwater is seeping in. In 2013, the United Nations said that there would be no potable water left in Gaza's main aquifer by 2016. Gaza has no big desalination plant and lacks the electricity to run it anyway.

See also
Hamastan
Palestinian political violence

References

External links

Pelham, Nicolas. Gaza's Tunnel Complex. Middle East Research Institute.

Politics of the State of Palestine
Politics of the Gaza Strip
Palestinian politics
Fatah–Hamas conflict
Gaza Strip